William Bridges (died 30 October 1714), of Wallington, Surrey, was a British politician who sat in the  English and  British House of Commons from 1695 to 1714.

Bridges was the son of Robert Bridges and his wife Mary (née Woodcock).

Bridges was returned as Member of Parliament (MP) for Liskeard, Cornwall at the 1695 English general election and sat until 1714. He was a member of the Board of Ordnance.

He acquired the estate of Kenwood House from Brook Bridges, rebuilding the house, and selling it in 1705 to John Walter of London.

References

1714 deaths
Year of birth missing
Members of the Parliament of Great Britain for constituencies in Cornwall
Members of the pre-1707 English Parliament for constituencies in Cornwall
British MPs 1707–1708
British MPs 1708–1710
British MPs 1710–1713
British MPs 1713–1715
English MPs 1695–1698
English MPs 1698–1700
English MPs 1701
English MPs 1701–1702
English MPs 1702–1705
English MPs 1705–1707